The following is a list of radio stations in Lagos, Nigeria.

References

Radio stations
Mass media in Lagos
Lagos